Ibadan South-East is a Local Government Area in Oyo State, Nigeria. Its headquarters are at Mapo Hall. The postal code of the area is 200.

Demographics
It has an area of 17 km and a population of 266,046 at the 2006 census.

References

Local Government Areas in Oyo State